Buffalo Lake is a lake in Wright County, in the U.S. state of Minnesota.

Buffalo Lake was named for its former abundance of buffalo fish.

See also
List of lakes of Minnesota

References

Lakes of Minnesota
Lakes of Wright County, Minnesota